Ram Niwas Mirdha (24 August 1924 – 29 January 2010) was an Indian politician from Rajasthan. He served as member of the Rajasthan Legislative Assembly from 1953 to 1967 and as speaker of the assembly from 1957 to 1967. Mirdha was as a cabinet minister of the Government of India for several departments during the 1970s and 1980s and became of member of the Lok Sabha for Barmer, Rajasthan, from 1991 to 1996. He was a member of the executive board of UNESCO from 1993 to 1997. He served as chairman of the Sangeet Natak Akademi until his death from multiple organ failure.He also Served as Deputy Chairperson of the Rajya Sabha from 1977 to 1980.

Family 

Ram Niwas Mirdha was born on 24 August 1924 in Jasol village, Barmer district, Rajasthan, where his father, Baldev Ram Mirdha, had been posted as a police officer. Mirdha married Indira Mirdha and the couple had two sons and one daughter. One of his sons is Harendra Mirdha, who has been a member of the Rajasthan Legislative Assembly and was Minister for the Public Works Department in the Government of Rajasthan between 1998–2004.

Education 
Mirdha was educated at Allahabad University, Lucknow University, both in India, and at the Graduate Institute of International Studies in Geneva, Switzerland. He was awarded M.A. and LL.B. degrees and was a professional agriculturist.

Official positions 
Mirdha held various official positions in the state of Rajasthan and at national level:

 Member, Rajasthan Legislative Assembly (1953–1967),
 Minister for Agriculture, Irrigation and Transport, Government of Rajasthan (1954–1957),
 Speaker, Rajasthan Legislative Assembly (1957–1967),
 Member, Rajya Sabha, 4-5-1967 to 2-4-1968 and 3-4-1968 to 2-4-1974( 2nd term ) and 3-4-1974 to 2-4-1980 (third term ) 
 Union Minister of State – Home Affairs, Department of Personnel and Administrative Reforms (June 1970–October 1974),
 Union Minister of State – Defence Production (October 1974 – December 1975,
 Union Minister of State – Supply and Rehabilitation (Independent Charge) (December 1975 – March 1977),
 Deputy Chairman, Rajya Sabha (1977–1980),
 Chairman, Committee of Privileges, Rajya Sabha, 1977–80, 
 Member of Rajya Sabha 5-7-1980 to 29-12-1984 (4th term ) 
 Minister of Water Resources Department (January 1983–August 1984),
 Minister of External Affairs (August 1984–December 1984),
 Minister of Communication January (1985-October 1986),
 Minister of Textiles (Cabinet Rank), with additional charge of Health and Family Welfare  (October 1986–December 1989),
 Member tenth Lok Sabha from Barmer, Rajasthan (1991–1996),
 Chairman of the Joint Parliamentary Committee to inquire into irregularities in Securities and Banking Transactions 1992,

International contribution 
Ram Niwas Mirdha represented in the following international events:

 Represented India at United Nations, Commonwealth Parliamentary Conferences,
 Commonwealth Prime Minister's Conference,
 Conference of Commonwealth Speakers and Presiding Officers, Inter Parliamentary Unions,
 Leader Indian Delegation to United Nations, General Assembly, September 1984,
 Member executive Board of UNESCO (1993–1997)

Cultural activities 

He was chairman of Lalit Kala Akademi, New Delhi, during 1976–1980 and 1990–1995, and was also involved with the National Institute of Sports and the Delhi Urban Arts Commission,  He was deputy chairman of the Special Organizing Committee for the 9th Asian Games  and president of the Youth Hostel Association of India.

Mirdha acted as co-chairman of the Indo-US Sub-commission on Culture and Education and was a member of the Executive Board of UNESCO and founder-president of Indian Heritage Society. In addition, he was a trustee of the Indira Gandhi National Centre for the Arts.

Heading institutes at the time death 
 President, Indian Heritage Society,
 Senior Vice-President, Institute of Constitutional and Parliamentary Studies.
 Honorary President, World Federation on U N Associations,
 President, Indian Federation of U N association,
 President, Indian Society of International Law,
 Chairman, Sangeet Natak Akademi (National Academy of Music, Dance and Drama),
 President Surajmal Memorial Education Society, New Delhi.

See also 
 Mirdha family

References

External links 
 Bio-Data of Member of X Lok Sabha
 Obituary by the Sangeet Natak Akademi
 Mirdha Dak

India MPs 1991–1996
1924 births
2010 deaths
Rajasthani people
Deaths from multiple organ failure
Indian National Congress politicians
Speakers of the Rajasthan Legislative Assembly
People from Nagaur district
University of Allahabad alumni
University of Lucknow alumni
Graduate Institute of International and Development Studies alumni
Deputy Chairman of the Rajya Sabha
India MPs 1984–1989
Lok Sabha members from Rajasthan
Rajya Sabha members from Rajasthan
Members of Parliament from Barmer
Ram Niwas
Rajasthan MLAs 1957–1962
Rajasthan MLAs 1967–1972
Rajasthan MLAs 1972–1977